Education in Puerto Rico is overseen by the Department of Education of Puerto Rico and the Puerto Rico Education Council. The Department oversees all elementary and secondary public education while the Council oversees all academic standards and issues licenses to educational institutions wishing to operate or establish themselves in Puerto Rico.

Instruction in Puerto Rico is compulsory between the ages of five and 18, which comprises the elementary and high school grades. Students may attend either public or private schools. As of 2013, the island had 1,460 public schools and 764 private schools; there were 606,515 K–12 students, 64,335 vocational students, and 250,011 university students. In 2021, the average public school size was 355 students. Because of damage caused by Hurricane Maria in 2017, a shrinking population, deteriorating infrastructure, and the Puerto Rican government-debt crisis, 283 schools were closed in Puerto Rico by 2018.

The literacy rate of the Puerto Rican population is 93%; when divided by gender, this is distributed as 92.8% for males and 93.8% for females. According to the 2000 Census, 60.0% of the population attained a high school degree or higher level of education, and 18.3% has a bachelor's degree or higher.

History

The first school in Puerto Rico was the Escuela de Gramática. The school was established by Bishop Alonso Manso in 1513, in the area where the Cathedral of San Juan was to be constructed. The school was free of charge and the courses taught were art, history, Latin language, literature, philosophy, science and theology.

The concept of public school wasn't used on the island until 1739; an official education system was created in 1865.  At the time, attendance was compulsory until age 9.  Public Education was organized into 500 centers by 1897.

The Foraker act of 1900 established the commissioner of education in Puerto Rico and created the department of public education. The commissioner of education was appointed by William McKinley, President of the United States.  The first commissioner 1900 – 1902 was Martin Grove Brumbaugh, who was the first professor pedagogy at the University of Pennsylvania, and was president of Juniata College. He reorganized the public school system, encourage both pupils and teachers to become bilingual in Spanish and English, and built a normal school for training teachers. Brumbaugh's education policies promoted Americanization, which  followed the policies  of Puerto Rico's two political parties,  which both were committed to turning Puerto Rico into an American state.  Samuel McCune Lindsay, appointed by the Theodore Roosevelt, President of the United States served as Education Commissioner 1902 – 1904 continued the policy preparing Puerto Rico for American statehood.  Laws passed in 1899 required education in Puerto Rico to consist of a public system for ages six to eighteen, to limit the student/teacher ratio to 50:1, and to be coed.  The 1900 Department of Public Instruction became the Department of Education in 1989.

Julian Go argues that the primary goals of American policy were:
Under American control, Puerto Ricans and Filipinos would vote in free elections, take up office, help devise legislation, and administer the colony's daily affairs-first in local (municipal) governments and later in national legislative assemblies. The native officials would be given more and more autonomy as they moved through this system, slowly learning their so-called  "object lessons" in American-styled governance. Local governments would be  granted more duties and functions, the legislative assemblies would be allowed to devise laws "with less and less assistance," and in general American control would be slowly loosened. The underlying principle of political education was  thus: "Free self-government in ever-increasing measure."

According to Go, in actual practice there was less and less local autonomy and more and more centralized control of education. The problem was that rich local elites based in the Federal Party had taken local control, and were not prepared to introduce local democracy against their personal interests.  Go argues that the local elites were corrupt and used the system for their own personal benefit, including pocketing a slice of the local government budget.

The commissioner of education led efforts to introduce American culture in preparation for a democratic society that would be admitted as an equal state to the union. English-language instruction was dominant until 1939, when Spanish was made the official language of instruction. English is currently taught as a second language beginning from first grade and continuing straight through senior year of high school.

Following American principles of separation of church and state, public school education became independent of religious instruction. The teaching of US history, replacing Puerto Rican historical figures with American ones, reciting the Pledge of Allegiance, and the celebrating American holidays were means to Americanize students on the island. Americanization was meant to uplift the locals.  The United States founded schools and trained both US and Puerto Rican teachers in education. Puerto Rican teachers were sent to the United States to receive training. In the island, US teachers would train Puerto Rican teachers. By 1913, the US government had invested 14 million dollars on public education in the island and 1,050 schools had been built in rural areas.

Protestants from the mainland arrived to build a non-Catholic educational infrastructure. Presbyterians were highly active and founded many primary and secondary schools. Presbyterian missionaries all spoke Spanish and were committed to supporting the local Hispanic cultural heritage.

Despite the dominance of Protestant and secular public education, Catholic schools also expanded during the early twentieth century. During the colonial era, there had been only three Catholic schools, but by 1917, there were twenty-seven. Another twenty-five had been founded by 1940.

Levels
Since an educational reform in 2018, the public school system in Puerto Rico has been organized into the following levels:

As of 2013, the overall educational system in Puerto Rico consists of seven categories. These categories are based on the educational levels covered:

Some Puerto Rican schools, most notably in rural areas, offer kinder to ninth grade (K–9) at the same institution and are referred to as Segunda Unidad. Other schools offer seventh grade to twelfth grade (7–12) at the same institution and are referred to as Nivel Secundario.

Elementary and secondary education

Public education
The Constitution of the Commonwealth of Puerto Rico grants the right to an education to every citizen on the island. To this end, public schools in Puerto Rico provide free and secular education at the elementary and secondary levels.

The public school system is funded by the commonwealth and is operated  by the Puerto Rico Department of Education (Departamento de Educación del Estado Libre Asociado de Puerto Rico) Inicio. The department employs over 45 thousand teachers of which 32,000 have full-time tenureships and are organized under several independent unions, including the Puerto Rico Teachers Association and the Teachers' Federation of Puerto Rico. The remaining teachers are either temporary or contracted on a yearly basis.

Preschool education, care, and services (including Early Head Start and Head Start) are free for low income families with private daycares being common and within walking distance in urban areas. Primary and secondary education is compulsory and free regardless of income through more than 1,400 public schools. Ten public schools are considered prestigious locally. All of them being magnet schools, which graduate the highest scores on the island of the College Board's PEAU (Latin America's equivalent of the SAT). Two examples of these are CIMATEC and CROEM which focus on science, technology, and mathematics.

Public schools in Puerto Rico are subject to the federal laws of the United States. The NCLB, No Child Left Behind Act included Puerto Rico until president Obama approved a waiver on October 22, 2013.

Education Department spokeswoman Yolanda Rosaly told The Associated Press on May 5, 2017 that approximately 27,000 students will be moved, as a result of 184 public school planned closings. The economic crisis in Puerto Rico drove the decision to close the schools, which officials have said will save millions of dollars.

Governor Ricardo Rosselló proposed a radical education reform bill in February 2018.  The reform bill hopes to give Puerto Rico's public school teachers the first raise in over ten years; an idea that some find skeptical.  He signed the legislation in March to incorporate a charter school voucher system after more than 600 amendments were made during debate.  Hurricane Maria caused an exodus of more than 25,000 students; the single centralized school district is projected to lose 54,000 students by 2021.  The voucher system is going to limit private schools to 3 percent of the student population; whereas the charter schools will receive 10 percent.

Language
Unlike most schools in the United States, public school instruction in Puerto Rico is conducted entirely in Spanish. English is taught as a second language and is a compulsory subject at all levels. In the early years following the 1898 American occupation of the island, the opposite was true: public schooling was entirely conducted in English, and Spanish was treated as a special subject as sanctioned by the US from 1903 to 1917 for grades 1 through 4; only by 1934 were grades five through eight also being taught in Spanish.  Upon the appointment of Blanton Winship to be governor of Puerto Rico, English was reinstated as the educational language until 1941; again, only utilizing English in primary schools.

Luis Muñoz Marín, the first popularly elected governor in 1948 appointed Mariano Villaronga Toro, Commissioner of Education on the island, and with him, an immediate switch back to using Spanish for instruction.  By the 1970s, bilingual programs were introduced to 113 of the schools in Puerto Rico.  In 2012, pro-statehood Governor Luis Fortuño caused controversy when he proposed that all courses in Puerto Rico public schools be taught in English instead of Spanish as they currently are.

Popular culture
Academic disciplines such as ethnomusicology, folklore, and cultural studies have helped legitimize scholarship on vernacular culture. For example.  Afro-Puerto Rican bomba has been included.

Private schools
Private schools in Puerto Rico are operated by non-governmental institutions. While accredited elementary and secondary private schools in Puerto Rico must meet minimum public education requirements for academic work, accreditation is optional.  There aren't any current policies regarding nursing/health, technology, professional development, or reimbursement when performing state/local functions.

There are more than 700 private schools on the island and over 8,000 teachers, most of them Catholic. It is constitutionally illegal to deny entrance or take action against students that profess a difference faith than the school they attend or intend to attend. Students from differing denominations are legally freed from attending religious activities on the schools they attend. Prominent private schools include The Episcopal Cathedral School, Colegio Católico Notre Dame, Academia Bautista de Puerto Nuevo, Academia del Perpetuo Socorro, Academia Maria Reina, Academia San Jorge, Colegio Marista Guaynabo, Colegio San Ignacio de Loyola, and Colegio San José which maintain a high rate of students being accepted into prominent universities in the United States.

Homeschooling
Homeschooling, an alternative form of education, is legal in Puerto Rico but is neither regulated nor legislated.  However, as of June 2017, Puerto Rico is the first among the US states and territories to declare homeschooling a fundamental right.

The issue of legislation has caused a serious rift within the homeschooling community. While some of these parents want the government to establish a public policy on homeschooling, others oppose all forms of legislation. They also allege that the lack of regulation has led them to confront difficulties when interacting with the government, as evidenced in the case of a home schooled student who was denied federal Social Security benefits.

From the Applicable Law portion of the decision:

Higher education
Over half of the students entering college level institutions in Puerto Rico, never graduate: 41% of four-year students in public universities and 33% in private institutions get a diploma.
8.90% of people in Puerto Rico earn an associate degree and 6.30% of people get graduate or professional degrees.

Community colleges and technical institutes
There are a number of technical school as well as community college in the town, including the Huertas College, and Mech-Tech College in Caguas, the ICPR Junior College in Hato Rey and Manati, American Educational College in Bayamón and Manati), the Instituto de Banca y Comercio, and the National University College (NUC) in Arecibo, Bayamón, Caguas, Ponce and Rio Grande. There is one state-run system, the Puerto Rico Technological Institute in San Juan, which possesses several programs at the local level and whose costs are significantly below market prices. Also, this can be very opinionated depending on what people are pursuing.

Instituto de Banca y Comercio
Ponce Paramedical College

Colleges and universities

The three major university systems on the island are the University of Puerto Rico with 11 campuses, the Ana G. Méndez University System (SUAGM) with 3 major campuses and some satellites, and the Interamerican University of Puerto Rico (Inter) with 9 campuses and 2 specialized schools.

The University of Puerto Rico performs the following"

The system is a source of patronage. Its board of trustees, chancellor, rectors, deans, and program directors change whenever a different political party gains power (about every 4 or 8 years), as the university is a government-owned corporation. Its flagship campus is also prone to student strikes, averaging about one strike every three years that halts the whole campus, with the system as a whole averaging about one strike every five years that halts the whole system. Most strikes derive from the university management attempting to raise the cost per credit the institution offers. This has been $55 per undergraduate credit and $117 per graduate credit. It is highly unlikely that a student graduates with college debt as a full Pell Grant covers most costs for low income students, and those that don't receive a full Pell Grant or a Pell Grant at all can easily cover tuition costs. This economic accessibility comes at a price for the taxpayers of Puerto Rico: 9.6% of the General Budget of the Government of Puerto Rico is automatically assigned to the university by law. In 2008, when the economy shrunk, so did the university's endowment. This resulted in problems for an already highly indebted university incapable of generating enough revenue to maintain itself. Because of this, the board of trustees increased tuition costs, which led to strikes. Other strikes were caused by the suggestion of reducing the percentage automatically assigned to the university. No bill has been filed for such purpose.

The University of Puerto Rico offers the largest academic choices with 472 academic programs of which 32 can lead to a doctorate. UPR is also the only system with a business school, an engineering school, a law school, a nursing school, a school of architecture, and a school of medicine. Almost all its schools and programs rank first on the island although competition has increased in the last decades with private universities gaining track at a fast pace. The Ana G. Méndez System, the Interamerican University, and the University of the Sacred Heart possess a business school with the University of Sacred Heart leading in non-profit management and social enterprise, as well as in communications. The Polytechnic University of Puerto Rico and the Turabo University both have engineering schools with the Polytechnic University leading in computer security and offering the only master's degree in computer science on the island. Ranking regarding law schools is subjective with the University of Puerto Rico School of Law, the Interamerican University of Puerto Rico School of Law, and the Eugenio María de Hostos School of Law considered the best although UPR still leads in constitutional law. The University of Puerto Rico School of Medicine and the University of Puerto Rico School of Dental Medicine lead in medicine and dentistry.

The Interamerican University of Puerto Rico, School of Optometry is the only school of optometry on the island. The Carlos Albizu University leads in psychology. The Metropolitan University leads in environmental management, The UPR leads in environmental science.

In terms of arts, the Atlantic University College leads in digital arts. The Conservatory of Music of Puerto Rico and the Escuela de Artes Plásticas y Diseño de Puerto Rico are considered leaders in music and arts respectively. The school of international relations was created in November 2013 under the name of Morales Carrión Diplomatic and Foreign Relations School, ascribed to the Department of State of Puerto Rico and still in development.

Almost all junior colleges, colleges, universities, and schools are accredited by the Middle States Association of Colleges and Schools. Specific programs tend to possess their respective accreditation as well (such as ABET, AACSB, LCME, and so on) although it is not uncommon for programs to not possess its expected accreditation—for example, only two business schools are accredited by AACSB.

See List of colleges and universities in Puerto Rico

Contemporary issues

Dropout rate
A study showed that about 19.10% of all students do not finish 9th grade.

According to the census, the high school graduation rate was 73.9% as of 2016.  Some mainland US citizens question whether the median household income contributes; Puerto Rico's median household income is less than $20,000, with 43% of people in poverty.

Current educational issues
The government announced the closure of 283 schools and a new pilot plan for charter schools and vouchers.
From 2010-2018 a total of 682 schools where closed of which only 17 where sold afterward. The school system has lost about 38,762 students since May 2017 due to closing of schools.
In addition, between August 2017 and January 2018 another 27,000 students will be out of the school systems.
Some of the schools don't have running water or electricity.
Education Secretary Julia Keleher has mentioned that they will save $150 million by closing most of the schools. However, on March 29, 2018, Gov. Ricardo Rosselló signed a bill that will allow charter schools and voucher programs to be established. The governments are trying to cut funding from education in order to restore the island after all the hurricanes that hit Puerto Rico.

Teachers have also lost their jobs. Based on United Federation of Teachers, it mentioned more than 2,600 teachers have received a letter saying they were excessed. Also, no teacher has received a raise since 2008 and beginning teachers earn $1,750 a month, although the cost of living is 10 percent higher than on the US mainland.

Parents' participation
A January 2014 news report stated that 55 percent of parents with children in public schools picked up their children's grades for the first semester of 2013–2014 school year on the scheduled day.

Poor performance in public schools

According to the Economist Intelligence Unit, 95% of public school students in Puerto Rico graduate at a sub-basic level while 60% do not even graduate. Furthermore, according to the Department of Education of Puerto Rico in 2012, 39% of public school students perform at a basic level (average performance) in Spanish in the Puerto Rican Tests of Academic Achievement. Likewise, 36% perform at a basic level in Mathematics while 35% perform at a basic level in English and 43% at a basic level in Science in said tests.

Moreover, studies published in 2003, 2005, and 2007 by the United States National Center for Education Statistics as part of the National Assessment of Educational Progress (NAEP) concluded that Puerto Rico falls below basic levels when compared to the United States – being basic defined as "partial mastery of the knowledge and skills that are fundamental for proficient work" according to NAEP. In particular the findings showed that:
 Overall, fourth- and eighth-grade students in Puerto Rico scored lower, on average, than public school students in the continental United States.
 12% of students in Puerto Rico scored at or above basic in fourth grade in comparison to the continental United States, where 79% of students scored at or above basic in the same grade.
 6% of students in Puerto Rico scored at or above basic in eighth grade in comparison to the United States where 68% of students in the United States scored at or above basic in the same grade.

As a result of this, 1,321 out of 1,466 public schools in Puerto Rico (about 90%) do not comply with the academic progress requirements established by the No Child Left Behind Act.

In 2013, the Nation's Report Card concluded that Puerto Rico falls below basic levels when compared to the United States. In particular the findings showed that:
 Overall, fourth- and eighth-grade students in Puerto Rico scored lower, on average, than public school students in the United States.
 11% of students in Puerto Rico scored at or above basic in fourth grade in comparison to the continental United States, where 89% of students scored at or above basic in mathematics.
 5% of students in Puerto Rico scored at or above basic in eighth grade in comparison to the United States where 95% of students in the United States scored at or above basic in Mathematics.

Also, the Nation's Report Card reported an average of 309 students per school in P.R., where in United States there are 504 students per school.

In 2017, Puerto Rico again ranked dead last in fourth-grade and eighth-grade math scores on the National Assessment of Educational Progress tests.

Market demand for college graduates
Puerto Rico is atypical as many youngsters pursue post-secondary studies even though the local market has no demand for them. For example, in 2012 50,000 students graduated at the undergraduate and graduate level while the labor market generated about 6,000 jobs per year of which 25% of those required that level of education. This effectively means that the Puerto Rican market has no demand for 97% of those who graduate with an undergraduate or graduate degree in Puerto Rico, although many find jobs out of the island.

Notable Puerto Rico educators

 Lolita Tizol
 Alfredo M. Aguayo
 Mariano Villaronga-Toro
 María Teresa Babín
 Elías López Sobá
 Eugenio María de Hostos

Notes

References

Further reading
 La Junta Local de Instrucción Pública de Ponce: una Experiencia Histórica (1900–1910). Cristina R. Torres. Caribbean University, Recinto de Ponce. 2011. (Accessible through La Revista de Investigación Cualitativa, ISSN 2164-7216, Unión Puertorriqueña de Investigadores Cualitativos (UPIC), sistema de acceso abierto (OJS). "Revistas de la Universidad de Puerto Rico." University of Puerto Rico.) Discusses the topic of the municipalization of public education in Puerto Rico.
 Solsiree del Moral, Negotiating Empire: The Cultural Politics of Schools in Puerto Rico, 1898–1952. Madison, WI; University of Wisconsin Press, 2013.

 
Society of Puerto Rico